{{DISPLAYTITLE:C11H11Cl2N3O}}
The molecular formula C11H11Cl2N3O (molar mass: 272.131 g/mol, exact mass: 271.0279 u) may refer to:

 Muzolimine
 WAY-161503

Molecular formulas